is a 2009 Japanese superhero film in the Ultra Series. The film released in theaters on December 12, 2009, by Warner Bros. Entertainment Japan. The film is also referred to as Large Monster: The Ultra Milky Way Legend. The film went on to gross $6,161,665 and become the second highest grossing Ultraman movie behind the previous year's entry. It is the first film directed by Koichi Sakamoto, marking the debut of Ultraman Zero and Ultraman Belial.

The film itself was preceded by Ultraman Mebius Side Story: Ghost Reverse, a direct-to-video special from Ultraman Mebius which lead to the movie's plot, and followed by a sequel Ultraman Zero: The Revenge of Belial in 2010.

Plot

After defeating a Bemular on a desert-like moon, Ultraman Mebius returns to his home planet Ultra, also known as Land of Light in Nebula M78, where he is reunited with Ultraman, Zoffy, and Ultraseven. Outside Ultra's orbit in the Space Prison, also known as the Belial Prison, Alien Zarab assumed the guise of an Imitation Ultraman to subdue the guards before using the Giga Battlenizer to release the prison's only occupant: The evil Ultraman known as Ultraman Belial. While Zarab was expecting an alliance, Belial kills the alien and takes back his Giga Battlenizer as he is confronted by a squadron of Ultras led by Ultraman Taro to contain him. But Belial overpowers them while proceeding to overpower every able-bodied Ultra in the Land of Light, including his former friends Ultraman Ken (Father of Ultra) and his wife Ultrawoman Marie (Mother of Ultra), as he makes his way to the Plasma Spark Tower to take the Plasma Spark which keeps the planet alive. As the planet begins freezing over, Ultraman and Ultraseven shielding themselves at the last moment, Taro protects the last fragment of light to prevent the planet's complete demise. As Belial flies off, having knocked the younger Ultraman off the planet during his rampage, Mebius returns to find his world a frozen wasteland while Ultraman and Ultraseven instruct Mebius to seek out the Reionics Rei.

Following their battle against Alien Reiblood, the ZAP Spacy group have arrived on the Earth-like Planet known as Dent where Rei and his Gomora just defeated a Zaragas when Mebius spirits Rei and appears in the form of his human guise Mirai Hibino. Mirai tells Rei the genesis of Planet Ultra: How the Plasma Spark initially created to replace M78's collapsing sun caused the evolution of the residential advanced human populace into Ultramen who used their powers to protect worlds from monsters also created by the radiation. But Belial was an exception, his temptation to gain more power from the Plasma Spark resulted in his banishment when he nearly endangered the planet. Belial ended up encountering Alien Reiblood, who fused into the Ultraman's body and further corrupted him into an Ultraman-Reionics. Belial used his ability to control hundreds of monsters with the Giga Battlenizer to raid the Land of Light in what came to be known Belial Revolt, nearly conquering the planet before being defeated and imprisoned in the newly created Space Prison by Ultraman King while his weapon was sealed away in Valley of Fire before it was found by Zarab. Rei agrees to aid the Ultraman in facing Belial, who has arrived to the Monster Graveyard to resurrect his army with the Plasma Spark's power.

Rei and Mirai soon land on the frozen surface of the Land of Light, ambushed on their journey to the Plasma Spark Tower by an Alien Shaplay that Belial sent with a Dorako, a Bemstar, and a Saramandora to intercept them. During the fight, Mirai's Mebium Brace is damaged by the Shaplay and Rei nearly loses his Battlenizer, but Ultraman, assuming a human form modeled after his host Shin Hayata, and Ultraseven in his Dan Moroboshi guise come to the youths' aid as the later uses his Capsule Monsters Windom, Miclas, and Agira to defeat the Shaplay's monsters. On the way to the tower, it is revealed there is another Ultraman who can assist but Ultraseven reveals that person was also exiled from Ultra. While the group arrived to the tower, they find themselves facing a now-revenge driven Shaplay while Rei and Gomora face a Black King. Once their opposition is dispatched, Taro gives the three Ultramen the last of the Plasma Spark's light to assume their Ultraman forms in a last ditch attempt to reclaim the Plasma Spark from Belial. Meanwhile, sent to a desert planet after almost touching the Plasma Spark when stopped by Ultraseven, the Ultraman known as Zero undergoes training by Ultraman Leo in training armor while observed by Ultraman King.

Once at the Monster Graveyard, the Ultramen and Rei's monsters battle Belial's army with Belial sensing kinship in Rei as he pressures the human to join him. When Rei refuses again, Belial uses his power to force the human into his Burst Mode and under Belial's control. Gomora assumes Reionic Burst Mode as it proceeds to attack the Ultramen with Ultraseven mortally wounded. Elsewhere in the universe, the ZAP Spacy crew are searching for Rei before they are saved from an ambush by a Nurse and its Alien Zetton wrangler by Ultraman Dyna who agrees to take them to the Monster Graveyard after they learned of Rei's location from the Zetton. Dyna attempts to fight Belial while the ZAP Spacy crew snaps Rei out of his Burst Mode. After brushing off Dyna, Belial attempts to kill the humans with Ultraseven taking the lethal attack before using the last of his strength to send his Eye Slugger to the desert planet where Zero is training. The crest-blade reached the planet just after Zero passed Leo's test when he saved the life of a Pigmon that was observing them. Both Leo and Ultraman King inform Zero that he saved the life of someone, the purpose of being an Ultraman, and they finally reveal to him that Ultraseven is his father and that his actions were to prevent Zero from the taking the path Belial took. Casting aside his training armor while using his father's Eye Slugger as a homing device, Zero reaches the Monster Graveyard and introduces himself as Ultraman Zero.

After Ultraseven died in his arms, an infuriated Zero defeated the remaining monsters of Belial's Monster Army before battling the evil Ultraman himself. After a long and vicious battle, Zero disarms Belial of the Giga Battlenizer and knocks him into a river of molten lava. But the souls of Belial's monsters converge on their master and form a massive exosuit-like monster called Belyudra which Belial has overpower the Ultramen. But Rei uses Giga Battlenizer to disrupt Belial's hold over the monsters, leaving Belyudra open to attack while Zero uses the Plasma Spark's energy to give him enough power to end Belial as he falls into Belyudra as it explodes. After the Plasma Spark is restored to its rightful place, the ZAP Spacy crew become the first humans to ever set foot on the Land of Light as they bid their goodbyes to Ultraman and Mebius as Dyna decides to accompany them a bit longer as his human host Shin Asuka. As Zero is reunited with a revived Ultraseven, the Ultras attend a moving speech by Ultraman King to remain ready for future threats that would threaten the universe. Back in the Monster Graveyard, a scarred Belial is revealed to have survived destruction of Belyudra.

Production and casting
Susumu Kurobe, of the original Ultraman, and Kohji Moritsugu, of the original Ultra Seven, returned to the film, as did Takeshi Tsuruno of Dyna, Taiyou Sugiura of Cosmos, Shunji Igarashi of Mebius, and Shota Minami of Ultra Galaxy. The film was directed by Koichi Sakamoto, the action director for the production of Power Rangers in New Zealand.  In addition to voice actor Mamoru Miyano voicing the new Ultraman Zero, former Prime Minister of Japan Junichiro Koizumi provided the voice for Ultraman King. To promote the movie and Windows 7, a special event was staged with Ultra Seven and his son Ultraman Zero alongside Microsoft employees.

Cast
 : 
 , : 
 , : 
 : 
 : 
 : 
 : 
 : 
 , : 
 , : 
 Residents of the Land of Light: , 
 : 
 : 
 : 
 : 
 : 
 : 
 : 
 : 
 : 
 : 
 : 
 : 
 : 
 : 
 : 
 : 
 : Former Prime Minister 
 : 
 Narration:

English dub actors
 Paul Stanko as Rei/Reimon
 William Knight as Shin Hayata/Ultraman
 G. Larry Butler as Dan Moroboshi/Ultraseven
 Frank Gerrish as Captain Hyuga
 Valerie Rose Lohman as Haruna
 Michael Kunselman as Kumano
 Josh Madson as Oki
 John Katona as Mirai Hibino/Ultraman Mebius
 Beau Marie as Ultraman Belial
 Daniel Van Thomas as Ultraman Zero
 Bryan Forrest as Shin Asuka/Ultraman Dyna
 Phil Miler as Ultraman Leo
 Robert Axelrod as Ultraman King
 Brad Potts as Ultraman Jack
 Kyle Rea as Ultraman 80
 William Winckler as Ultraman Taro
 Lisle Wilkerson as Mother of Ultra
 Mark Chinnery as Researcher
 Jay Dee Witney as Ultra Guard
 Kent Shocknek as Battlenizer
 Adam Sartain as Narrator

Theme song

Composition: Sinkiroh
Arrangement: 
Lyrics & Artist: MISIA
Japanese R&B singer MISIA performs the film's theme song, with its music video featuring MISIA, Ultraman, Alien Baltan, Dada, Pigmon, and Alien Metron. The single is sold as both a standard edition containing just the CD single and a limited edition which includes the CD single and a gold-colored statuette of a caped Ultraman. The other tracks on the single are the remix "Hoshi no Yō ni... (Gomi's Ultra Legend Club Mix)" which includes Ultraman vocals and the song "ULTRA X'MAS". The song is also featured on her album Just Ballade while the remix is included on the album for the film's original soundtrack, score composed by Mike Verta.

Reception

The film earned $6.1 million at the Japanese box office. On Rotten Tomatoes, 81% on the positive rate.

Video game
A pinball game called Ultra Legend Pinball was released internationally for the iPhone and iPod Touch as an application in the App Store. The download for the application is free, but an in-app purchase of JP¥350/US$2.99/GB£1.79/€2,39 is required to play the full game (the "Free Version" is only a demo version). Also, there's a new Ultra Galaxy Legend Game release for Wii.

References

External links
Ultra-Legend.com – Official website 

2009 films
Crossover tokusatsu films
Ultra Series films
Mega Monster Battle
Films directed by Koichi Sakamoto
Films about father–son relationships
2000s Japanese films